Viburnum sieboldii, or Siebold's viburnum, is a plant in the muskroot family, Adoxaceae.

Description
Viburnum sieboldii is a large shrub or small tree with opposite, simple leaves, on stout, brittle stems. The flowers are white, borne in spring.

sieboldii